Ja Shiran (also Romanized as Ja Shīrān) is a village in Solduz Rural District, in the Central District of Naqadeh County, West Azerbaijan Province, Iran. At the 2006 census, its population was 350, in 58 families.

The village is populated by Sunni Kurds and Shia Azerbaijanis.

References 

Populated places in Naqadeh County

Kurdish settlements in West Azerbaijan Province